The 2014 Russian Figure Skating Championships was held from 24–27 December 2013 in Sochi. Medals were awarded in the disciplines of men's singles, ladies' singles, pair skating, and ice dancing. The results were among the criteria used to select Russia's teams sent to the 2014 Winter Olympics, the 2014 World Championships, and the 2014 European Championships.

Competitions

Medalists of most important competitions

Senior Championships
The senior Championships were held in Sochi for the second year in a row. Anastasia Martiusheva / Alexei Rogonov withdrew before the event due to injury and were replaced by alternates Anastasia A. Gubanova / Alexei Sintsov. Maxim Trankov was a commentator for Russian TV.

31-year-old Evgeni Plushenko, a ten-time national champion, was first in the men's short program by over five points ahead of 18-year-old Maxim Kovtun, with Sergei Voronov coming in third. In the free skate, Kovtun upset Plushenko to win his first national title, outscoring him by 11.09 points in the segment and 5.76 points overall. Voronov took the bronze, his sixth national medal. In fourth place overall was the 2011 national champion, 30-year-old Konstantin Menshov, who had to climb from 10th after the short program, while 15-year-old Adian Pitkeev finished fifth, 0.08 of a point ahead of Artur Gachinski. Mikhail Kolyada withdrew during the long program, unable to fix a problem with his laces.

In the short dance, defending national champions Ekaterina Bobrova / Dmitri Soloviev scored 4.60 points more than second-placed Elena Ilinykh / Nikita Katsalapov. The 2012 World Junior champions, Victoria Sinitsina / Ruslan Zhiganshin, landed in third place, 0.48 of a point ahead of the defending Russian bronze medalists, Ekaterina Riazanova / Ilia Tkachenko. Bobrova / Soloviev also placed first in the free dance and won their fourth national title, defeating Ilinykh / Katsalapov by 7.29 points in the segment and 11.89 overall. The silver medalists both fell as a result of their blades clashing. Sinitsina / Zhiganshin took bronze—their first senior national medal—by outscoring Riazanova / Tkachenko by 1.13 points in the segment and 1.61 overall. The 2011 World Junior champions, Ksenia Monko / Kirill Khaliavin, finished in fifth place ahead of Alexandra Stepanova / Ivan Bukin, who won the same title in 2013.

Ksenia Stolbova / Fedor Klimov earned a narrow victory in the pairs' short program, scoring 0.47 more than the 2012 national champions, Vera Bazarova / Yuri Larionov, while Evgenia Tarasova / Vladimir Morozov were five points back in third. The top two were nearly tied in the free skate, Bazarova / Larionov placing first by 0.02. Stolbova / Klimov finished first overall by 0.45 and won their first national title. Maria Vigalova / Egor Zakroev, competing as juniors internationally, moved up from fourth to take the bronze medal. The next four pairs clustered within 2.60 points of each other, led by Julia Antipova / Nodari Maisuradze who finished fourth for the second year in a row. Tarasova / Morozov dropped to eighth overall. Although she was hurt when they both fell during a lift near the end of their program, she was able to resume and complete the final element, a pair spin.

The 2012 national champion Adelina Sotnikova was first in the ladies' short program, 2.21 points ahead of Yulia Lipnitskaya, while Elena Radionova edged Alena Leonova by 0.73 of a point for third position. Lipnitskaia narrowly won the free skate, just 0.25 separating her from Sotnikova. Her overall score was 1.96 less than Sotnikova who won her fourth national title while Lipnitskaia took her second silver medal. Radionova remained in third, winning bronze. 13-year-old Alexandra Proklova finished fourth, edging out Leonova who slipped to fifth with a seventh-place free skate. Defending national champion Elizaveta Tuktamysheva finished 10th.

Schedule
 Tuesday, December 24
 14:00 – Men's short
 16:45 – Opening ceremony
 17:45 – Pairs' short
 20:00 – Short dance
 Wednesday, December 25
 14:00 – Ladies' short
 16:45 – Men's free
 20:00 – Free dance
 Thursday, December 26
 16:00 – Pairs' free
 18:40 – Ladies' free
 Friday, December 27
 13:00 – Medal ceremonies
 14:00 – Exhibitions

Results

Men

Ladies

Pairs

Ice dancing

Junior Championships
The 2014 Russian Junior Championships were held on 22–25 January 2014 in Saransk.

Results

Men

Ladies

Pairs

Ice dancing

International team selections

European Championships
The team to the 2014 European Championships was announced on 27 December 2013 as follows:

Winter Olympics
The team to the 2014 Winter Olympics was announced on 22 January 2014 as follows:

World Junior Championships
The team to the 2014 World Junior Championships was announced on 28 January 2014 and amended in March 2014.

World Championships
Russia's provisional team to the 2014 World Championships was published by the International Skating Union on 4 March and confirmed by the Russian federation on 17 March:

References

External links
Senior
 Results
 Protocol
 2014 Russian Championships at the Russian Figure Skating Federation
Junior
 Results
 Protocol
 2014 Russian Junior Championships at the Russian Figure Skating Federation

Russian Figure Skating Championships
Russian Championships
Russian Championships
Figure Skating Championships
Figure Skating Championships